Figure drawings are projective diagnostic techniques in which an individual is instructed to draw a person, an object or a situation, so that cognitive, interpersonal, or psychological functioning can be assessed. The Kinetic Family Drawing, developed in 1970 by Burns and Kaufman, requires the test-taker to draw a picture of his or her entire family. Children are asked to draw a picture of their family, including themselves, "doing something." This picture is meant to elicit the child's attitudes toward his or her family and the overall family dynamics. The KFD is sometimes interpreted as part of an evaluation of child abuse.

Interpretations of all projective tests should be made only by a credentialed clinical psychologist, or a credentialed art therapist. The limitations of projective tests should be considered. It is generally a good idea to use projective tests as part of an overall test battery.

Method
Despite the flexibility in administration and interpretation of figure drawings, these tests require skilled and trained administrators familiar with both the theory behind the tests and the structure of the tests themselves. The KFD involves the examiner instructing the child to draw a picture of themselves, and everyone in his or her family, doing something. The examiner may then ask the child questions about the drawing, such as what is happening and who is in the picture. Certain characteristics of the drawing are noted upon analysis, such as the placement of family members; the absence of any members; whether the figures are relatively consistent with reality or altered by the child; the absence of particular body parts; erasures; elevated figures; and so on.

The KFD was created as an extension of the Family Drawing Test (Burns & Kaufman, 1972).  The kinetic aspect refers to the instructions given to the child to draw his or her family members doing something.

The KFD is similar to other psychometric projective techniques such as the Draw-A-Person Test developed by Machover and the House-Tree-Person (HTP) technique developed by Buck.

See also
 Draw-A-Person test
 House-Tree-Person test

References
 Burns, Robert C. and Kaufman, S. H. (1987). Kinetic Family Drawings (K-F-D): An Introduction to Understanding Children Through Kinetic Drawings, New York : Brunner/Mazel.
 Groth-Marnat, Gary. Handbook of Psychological Assessment, 3rd edition. New York: John Wiley and Sons, 1997.
 Kline, Paul. The Handbook of Psychological Testing, New York: Routledge, 1999.
 Reynolds, Cecil R. Comprehensive Clinical Psychology, Volume 4: Assessment, Amsterdam: Elsevier, 1998.
 Anastasi, A., & Urbina, S. (d1997). Psychological Testing, 7th Ed. Upper Saddle River, NJ: Prentice Hall, Inc.
 Burns, Robert C. (1987). Kinetic-house-tree-person drawings (K-H-T-P) : an interpretative manual. New York : Brunner/Mazel.

External links
 SECASA

Projective tests